Emanuele Suagher (born 26 November 1992) is an Italian professional football player who plays for  club Pro Sesto as a defender.

Club career

Atalanta

Loan to Tritium
On 1 July 2011, Suagher was signed by Serie C side Tritium on a season-long loan deal alongside Marcello Possenti, Jurgen Pandiani and Christian Monacizzo. On 12 September he made his professional debut as a substitute replacing Daniele Casiraghi in the 70th minute of a 2–0 home win over Ternana. On 12 October, Saugher played his first match as a starter for Tritium, a 1–1 home draw against Foggia, he was replaced by Filippo Corti in the 55th minute. On 23 October he played his first entire match for Tritium, a 2–1 home defeat against Pro Vercelli. On 19 December he was sent off with a red card in the 28th minute of a 1–0 away win over Viareggio. On 4 April 2012, Suagher was sent off for the second time in the 70th minute of a 3–1 away defeat against Reggiana. Suagher ended his season-long loan to Tritium with 22 appearances, 16 as a starter.

Loan to Pisa
On 1 July 2012, Suagher was loaned to Serie C club Pisa on a season-long loan deal. On 12 August he made his debut for Pisa 4–2 defeat at penalties after a 2–2 away draw against Padova in the second round of Coppa Italia. On 2 September he made his Serie C debut for Pisa in a 3–1 home win over Latina, but he was replaced only after 2 minute by Paolo Rozzio. On 3 March 2013 he played his first entire match for Pisa, a 0–0 home draw against Paganese. On 28 April he scored his first professional goal in the 30th minute of a 3–1 away win over Prato. Suagher ended his season-long loan to Pisa with 14 appearances, all as a starter, and 1 goal.

Loan to Crotone
On 12 July 2013, Suagher was signed by Serie B club Crotone on a season-long loan deal. On 11 August he made his debut for Crotone in a 2–0 home win over Latina in the second round of Coppa Italia, he was replaced by Giuseppe Prestia in the 32nd minute. On 23 November he made his Serie B debut for Crotone as a substitute replacing Lorenzo Pasqualini in the 69th minute of a 3–2 home win over Avellino. On 29 December he played his first match as a starter for Crotone, a 2–1 home defeat against Palermo, he was replaced by Ewome Kelvin Matute in the 60th minute. On 27 January 2018, Suagher played his first entire match for Crotone, a 0–0 home draw against Robur Siena. Suagher ended his loan to Crotone with 24 appearances.

Loan to Carpi
On 25 August 2014, Suagher was loaned to Serie B club Carpi on a season-long loan deal. On 30 August he made his Serie B debut for Carpi as a substitute replacing Raffaele Bianco in the 89th minute of a 1–1 away draw against Livorno. On 19 September he played his first entire match for Carpi, a 2–2 home draw against Trapani. On 22 November he was sent off with a double yellow card in the 61st minute of a 3–3 away draw against Brescia. In early February 2015 he broke his anterior cruciate ligament and the recovery time is expected to be six months. Suagher ended his season-long loan to Carpi with 20 appearances and with the Serie B title.

Second loan to Carpi
After being 3 times an unused substitute in the first part of the season, on 4 January 2016, Suagher was loaned back to Carpi on a 6-month loan deal. On 9 January he made his Serie A debut as a substitute replacing Jerry Mbakogu in the 91st minute of a 2–1 home win over Udinese. On 24 January he played his first entire match in Serie A for Carpi, a 1–1 away draw against Inter. Suagher ended his loan to Carpi with 9 appearances, including 8 as a starter but Carpi was relegated in Serie B.

Loan to Bari
On 25 January 2017, Suagher was signed by Serie B club Bari on a season-long loan.

Loan to Avellino and Cesena
On 24 July 2017, Suagher was loaned to Serie B club Avellino on a season-long loan deal. In January 2018 he joined to Serie B club Cesena on a 6-month loan deal.

Third loan to Carpi
On 3 August 2018, Suagher joined for the third time to Carpi on loan until 30 June 2019.

Ternana
On 11 July 2019, he joined Ternana on a 2-year contract.

Feralpisalò
On 15 July 2021, he signed a two-year contract with Feralpisalò. On 27 January 2022, he joined Vibonese on loan.

Pro Sesto
On 25 August 2022, Suagher moved to Pro Sesto.

International career
He represented Italy at the under-19 level in two friendlies: against Romania and Turkey. He played 4 matches in 2011–12 Four Nations Tournament and 3 friendlies against Ghana, Macedonia and Denmark.

References

External links
 
 

1992 births
Living people
People from Romano di Lombardia
Footballers from Lombardy
Italian footballers
Association football defenders
Serie A players
Serie B players
Serie C players
Atalanta B.C. players
Tritium Calcio 1908 players
Pisa S.C. players
F.C. Crotone players
A.C. Carpi players
S.S.C. Bari players
U.S. Avellino 1912 players
A.C. Cesena players
Ternana Calcio players
FeralpiSalò players
U.S. Vibonese Calcio players
S.S.D. Pro Sesto players
Italy youth international footballers
Italy under-21 international footballers